Jamba is a village in Bap Tehsil in Jodhpur District of Rajasthan.The Jambholav Dham Temple is located here.

Villages in Jodhpur district